Emma Johnson (born October 23, 1976) is an American journalist, blogger, author, shared parenting activist, and media personality. She is best known for her blog Wealthysinglemommy.

Early life 
Johnson was born in Norwalk, Connecticut, and grew up in Sycamore, Illinois. She was raised by a single mom and has two younger brothers. She went to the local public schools as well as studying abroad in Luneville for her junior year in high school. She graduated from University of Illinois, Champaign-Urbana in 1998 with a degree in print journalism and studied at Universidad San Francisco in Quito, Ecuador, and also worked at the student newspaper, The Daily Illini.

Early career
Emma Johnson is best known as a journalist and blogger at Wealthysinglemommy. After graduating from college Johnson held an internship at CNN in Atlanta. From there she worked as a general news reporter for the Valdosta Daily Times in Valdosta, Georgia, then spent six months editing an English language news digest in Sofia, Bulgaria. From there Johnson joined the East Valley Tribune in the Phoenix, Arizona metro area where she won several awards for her work as a health care reporter. Johnson moved to New York City in 2003 where she was hired at the Associated Press's then-new financial wire. Starting in 2005, Johnson worked as a full-time freelance business and personal finance journalist. Her articles have been published in The New York Times, The Wall Street Journal, USA Today, Glamour, Forbes, Men's Health, Woman's Day, Parenting, WIRED, SUCCESS, where she was a contributing editor, and MSN Money, where she hosted a video column.

Blog
As a blogger of Wealthysinglemommy, Johnson writes about her life as a professional, single parent in New York City, and gender equality. She is known for taking a strong stand that women should continue their careers and strive for financial independence after having children, for equally shared parenting, and that mothers should be open and honest with their children about their dating.

Since launching in August 2012, the blog gained an international following and media attention. The blog has been criticized for being unrealistic in her dating advice, and judgmental of other women's choices, including by bloggers at The Chicago Tribune.

Wealthysinglemommy has been cited by major media outlets including The New York Times. Parents magazine named Wealthysinglemommy "Best of the Web." Johnson was listed as one of AOL DailyFinance's "20 Personal Finance Influencers to Follow on Twitter" and one of "11 Female Finance Influencers You Should be Following" per U.S. News. Johnson and Wealthysinglemommy have been quoted as an expert in the New York Times, Wall Street Journal, O the Oprah Magazine, NBC Today's blog, Headline News, HuffingtonPost Live, Woman's Day, Ryan Seacrest Radio, NPR, Business Insider, Fox News, The Houston Chronicle, CBS Radio, NBC Nightly News and Yahoo! Personal Finance.

Podcast

Johnson's podcast, "Like a Mother with Emma Johnson," featured interviews and commentary on issues facing professional mothers, including work, career, business, relationships, parenting, politics, and sex. Named to USNews’ "Top 15 Personal Finance Podcasts," Like a Mother has featured Arianna Huffington, Millionaire Matchmaker Patti Stanger, Free-Range Kids’ Lenore Skenazy, Tinder founder Whitney Wolfe and feminist journalist Rebecca Traister.

Author 
Johnson's first book, The Kickass Single Mom: Be Financially Independent, Discover Your Sexiest Self, and Raise Fabulous, Happy Children, was published October 17, 2017. The nonfiction book is published by Penguin Random House and named by New York Post as a ‘Smart, Must-Read.'

Johnson's second book, The 50/50 Solution: How Single Parents Can Blaze the Trail for Gender Equality, is to be published in mid-2023.

Activism 
Emma Johnson founded Moms for Shared Parenting, a non-profit organization advocating for 50/-50 shared parenting. 
From the website: "Our mission is to promote equally shared parenting, with a focus on what is best for children, while simultaneously closing the gender pay gap." Johnson has testified as an expert in favor of presumption of equally shared parenting at the United Nations, Google at state legislature hearings in Georgia and South Dakota. Emma’s shared-parenting activism has been featured in TIME, CNBC, Elle, Fox Business Radio, Parents magazine and Forbes.

Personal life 
Johnson lives in New York City with her two young children. She married in 2005 and divorced in 2009. She is single. New York Observer named her to its "9 Most Eligible Singles" list.

Publications 
 2017, The Kickass Single Mom: Be Financially Independent, Discover Your Sexiest Self, and Raise Fabulous, Happy Children
2018, 30‑Day Kickass Single Mom Money Makeover: Get Your Financial Act Together

References 

1976 births
Living people
American women bloggers
American bloggers
University of Illinois Urbana-Champaign College of Media alumni
21st-century American women